Towamensing Township is a lightly populated rural township in eastern Carbon County, Pennsylvania. It is part of Northeastern Pennsylvania.

The Lenape Indian tribe's name is eponymous and was once applied by the natives to the whole region of Carbon County and bits of the Poconos to the north (Luzerne County) and to Schuylkill County (southwest). The population was 4,477 at the 2010 census, up from 3,475 at the 2000 census. A portion of Beltzville State Park is in the township.

Geography
Towamensing Township is in southeastern Carbon County and is bordered by Monroe County to the east. It is drained by Aquashicola Creek and Pohopoco Creek into the Lehigh River. The township's northern boundary runs along the base of Call Mountain. Its villages include Forest Inn, Jonesville, Stemlersville, and Trachsville.

Neighboring municipalities
 Lower Towamensing Township - (Southerly)
 Franklin Township - (due West-southwest)
 Penn Forest Township - (Northerly)
 Polk Township, Monroe County - (Northeasterly)
 Eldred Township, Monroe County - (Southeasterly)

Climate
The township has a humid continental climate (Dfa/Dfb) and the hardiness zone is 6a. Average monthly temperatures in Forest Inn range from in 27.0 °F in January to 71.2 °F in July.

Demographics

As of the census of 2000, there were 3,475 people, 1,275 households, and 1,003 families residing in the township. The population density was 128.6 people per square mile (49.7/km). There were 1,458 housing units at an average density of 54.0/sq mi (20.8/km). The racial makeup of the township was 98.65% White, 0.43% African American, 0.09% Native American, 0.23% Asian, 0.17% from other races, and 0.43% from two or more races. Hispanic or Latino of any race were 1.24% of the population.

There were 1,275 households, out of which 34.4% had children under the age of 18 living with them, 69.3% were married couples living together, 5.2% had a female householder with no husband present, and 21.3% were non-families. 15.8% of all households were made up of individuals, and 6.2% had someone living alone who was 65 years of age or older. The average household size was 2.71 and the average family size was 3.03.

In the township the population was spread out, with 24.1% under the age of 18, 5.6% from 18 to 24, 30.9% from 25 to 44, 26.1% from 45 to 64, and 13.3% who were 65 years of age or older. The median age was 40 years. For every 100 females, there were 100.4 males. For every 100 females age 18 and over, there were 100.1 males.

The median income for a household in the township was $49,524, and the median income for a family was $51,135. Males had a median income of $36,638 versus $21,103 for females. The per capita income for the township was $19,629. About 4.5% of families and 4.7% of the population were below the poverty line, including 5.6% of those under age 18 and 6.7% of those age 65 or over.

Transportation

U.S. Route 209 is the only numbered highway passing through Towamensing Township. It crosses from northeast-to-southwest on the southeast side of Beltzville Lake.

References
 

Populated places established in 1768
Townships in Carbon County, Pennsylvania
1768 establishments in Pennsylvania
Townships in Pennsylvania